The priestly breastplate or breastpiece of judgment ( ḥōšen) was a sacred breastplate worn by the High Priest of the Israelites, according to the Book of Exodus. In the biblical account, the breastplate is termed the breastplate of judgment ( ḥōšen mišpāṭ - ), because the Urim and Thummim ( hāʾūrīm wəhattummīm) were placed upon it.(). These elements of the breastplate are said in the Exodus verse to carry the judgement ( mišpāṭ) of God concerning the Israelites at all times.

Hebrew Bible 

According to the description in Exodus, this breastplate was attached to the tunic-like garment known as an ephod by gold chains/cords tied to the gold rings on the ephod's shoulder straps, and by blue ribbon tied to the gold rings at the belt of the ephod. The biblical description states that the breastplate was also to be made from the same material as the Ephod—embroidery of 3 colors of dyed wool and linen—and was to be  of a cubit squared, two layers thick, and with four rows of three engraved gems embedded in gold settings upon it, one setting for each stone.

The Hebrew term for the breastplate,  (ḥōšen), appears to be named from its appearance, The 19th-century German biblical scholar August Dillmann thought that it was likely to be derived from the Hebrew word  (ḥōṣen), meaning "fold", relating to its function.

According to the Talmud, the wearing of the Hoshen atoned for the sin of errors in judgment on the part of the Children of Israel.

The jewels 

The twelve jewels in the breastplate were each, according to the Biblical description, to be made from specific minerals, none of them the same as another, and each of them representative of a specific tribe, whose name was to be inscribed on the stone. According to a rabbinic tradition, the names of the twelve tribes were engraved upon the stones with what is called in Hebrew: שמיר = shamir, which, according to Rashi, was a small, rare creature which could cut through the toughest surfaces, but according to Rabbi David Kimhi and Rabbi Jonah ibn Janah, was a stone stronger than iron (possibly Naxian stone). The word has its equivalent in the Greek, σμήρις (smeris).

There are different views in classical rabbinical literature as to the order of the names; the Jerusalem Targum, for example, argued that the names appeared in the order according to which they were born. Maimonides describes the jewel stones arranged in four rows, saying that on the first stone belonging to Reuben were also engraved the names of Abraham, Isaac and Jacob, while on the last stone belonging to Benjamin were also engraved the words "the tribes of God"; kabbalistic writers such as Hezekiah ben Manoah and Bahya ben Asher argued that only six letters from each name were present on each stone, together with a few letters from the names of Abraham, Isaac, or Jacob, or from the phrase "[these are] the tribes of Jeshurun", so that there were 72 letters in total (72 being a very significant number in Kabbalistic thought).

There was also a different order for the names inscribed on the two "onyx"  stones, carried on the High Priest's shoulders. One opinion suggests that the names of the twelve tribes were arranged in groups after their mothers: Leah's six sons aligned one after the other on one stone, with Judah heading this list, followed by Rachel's sons with the names of the concubines' sons interposed between the two sons of Rachel. 

Unfortunately, the meanings of the Hebrew names for the minerals, given by the masoretic text, are not clear, and though the Greek names for them in the Septuagint are more clear, some scholars believe that they cannot be completely relied on for this matter because the breastplate had gone out of use by the time the Septuagint was created, and several Greek names for various gems have changed meaning between the classical era and modern times. However, although classical rabbinical literature argues that the names were inscribed using a Shamir worm because neither chisels nor paint nor ink were allowed to mark them out, a more naturalistic approach suggests that the jewels must have had comparatively low hardness in order to be engraved upon, and therefore this gives an additional clue to the identity of the minerals. Others suggest that they were engraved with emery, having the similar property of a diamond used in cutting other stones and which was called in Greek σμήρις (smeris).

Explanation of the symbolic meaning of the jewels generated a great deal of both Jewish and Christian writing, and was a staple component of the tradition of lapidaries or books on gemology.

The jewel stones are as follows (the first item in each row is probably the right hand side, as Hebrew is a right to left script):

First row 

Odem (in the masoretic text) / Sardios (in the Septuagint) – both names mean red (Odem is cognate with Adam), and probably refers to sard, a very common stone in classical cultures. All authors agree that this stone was of a red colour. With due respect to the Septuagint, Odem might also refer to carnelian, which was flesh-coloured, or to jasper, which was usually a deep blood-red, was valued as a charm against bleeding, and was common in the surrounding nations of Egypt, Babylonia, and Assyria. The Chinese Union Version refers to this stone as being a ruby.
Pit'dah (פִּטְדָה in the masoretic text) / Topazios (in the Septuagint) – despite the suggestion of the Septuagint that it was topaz, topaz was scarcely known at the time the Book of Exodus was written (according to both the traditional dating of the book and that by critical scholars); in the classical era, topazios referred to Topazos Island, on which a particular yellow mineral was mined (topazios means to seek, in reference to the difficulty in finding the island). Others suggest that topaz was merely peridot, a light green semi-precious stone, and which stone in the ancient world was found primarily on Topazos Island as well as on St. John's Island (Zabargad) in the Egyptian Red Sea. The word pit'dah is thought by scholars to be connected with the Assyrian word hipindu, which refers to something that flashed (presumably meaning shimmered), and thus the jewel in question would fit the description of chrysolite, a translucent greenish yellow mineral, common throughout the Levant, and particularly found on Zabargad in the Red Sea, under the control of the Egyptian Pharaoh.
Bareḳet (בָּרֶקֶת in the masoretic text, cf. בָּרְקַת) / Smaragdos (in the Septuagint) – Bareketh etymologically means 'lightning flash', whence shimmering or shiny. Smaragdos is cognate with emerald, but is somewhat of a false friend as the Greek term could apply to a number of different green gems, not just the emerald in particular. Smaragdos was often used in Greek literature to refer to an intensely bright crystal found in columnar formations. Emerald in the stricter modern sense of green beryl exists locally in Egypt. Items carved from emerald are known from as early as the 12th Dynasty, 1900s BCE, during the Bronze Age. But these emeralds are random finds, and not actively mined until the Ptolemaic period. Cleopatra, the last of the Ptolemies, is famous for her love for the Egyptian emerald. Other minerals resembling emerald are heliodor (taking into account the implication of Smaragdos that it was green) and rock crystal (ignoring the literal meaning of Smaragdos, since the masoretic text does not appear to specify colour); there is much to be said for Smaragdos being either of those. Although "emerald" is the most common form used to describe the Hebrew word, bareḳet, in other sources (e.g. the Septuagint on Ezekiel 28:13), the word bareḳet is rendered as "onyx". Aquilas the proselyte (Onkelos), in his Aramaic translation of the Pentateuch, writes בָרקָן = barḳan, for this word. According to the Midrash Rabba (Numbers Rabba 2:7), the stone called bareḳet had veins or parallel bands of colours white, black and red running through it, suggesting that it may have actually been a kind of agate or onyx. This may explain why in some French translations the word is rendered as "agate". In the South Arabian dialect spoken in Yemen during the Middle Ages, baḳarani (believed to be a corruption of barḳan) was an exceptionally beautiful and rare onyx stone mined on Mount Anis, in Yemen, one variety of which having a red surface with a vein of white over another of black running through it. Symmachus, an ancient Jewish translator whose Greek translation of the Pentateuch appeared in Origen's Hexapla, has also written κεραύνιος, literally meaning ‘of a thunderbolt’, and a more direct translation of the stone known in Hebrew as bareḳet relating to baraḳ ‘lightning’ in Exodus 28:17. Jerome, however, understood the Greek word to mean "onyx".

Second row 

Nofekh (נֹפֶךְ = in the masoretic text) / Anthrax (in the Septuagint) – while Anthrax simply means coal (presumably here referring to the colour of burning coal), the Vulgate here has Carbunculus, referring to the carbuncle, which was red. Philo of Alexandria, when writing about this stone, says that it was red. He seems to be in agreement with Josephus, the LXX, and the Jerusalem Targum, the latter saying that it is כדכדנא, explained by Saadia Gaon as meaning karkand, a red variety of precious stone. Nofekh appears to be a loan word; it may derive from the Egyptian term mfkꜣt, referring to malachite or turquoise, both of which are a greenish blue; it may instead derive from lupakku, a term appearing in the Amarna letters, referring to a mineral of unknown colour which was sent in tribute to Akhnaten from Ashkalon. In classical rabbinical literature there is some debate between whether Nofekh was red or greenish blue; Exodus Rabbah and the second Jerusalem Targum favour it being red, while the Babylonian Targum and first Jerusalem Targum favour it being green.
Sapir (סַפִּיר = in the masoretic text) / Sapphiros (in the Septuagint) – despite appearing to refer to sapphire, sapphire was essentially unknown before the era of the Roman Empire and its use in Greek texts is believed to be a mere transliteration of the Hebrew. Once it became more known, it was treated as merely being a form of hyacinth or of jacinth. It is more likely that the term Sapir referred to a mineral of similar colour to sapphires, and that the name gradually came to refer to the latter mineral, on account of its colour; scholars think the most likely candidate is lapis lazuli, a stone with a deep, ocean-blue colour which was frequently sent as a gift to Akhenaten from Babylon. Theophrastus mentions the stone sapphirus as being "dark" and having the "colour of verdigris", as well as being "speckled as of with gold". By all accounts, his description fits the lapis-lazuli.
Yahalom (יָהֲלֹם = in the masoretic text) / Iaspis ἴασπις (in the Septuagint) – in some other places the Septuagint instead has Beryllios where the masoretic reads Yahalom. The word Yahalom appears to be connected with the Hebrew meaning strike hard, and possibly with the word hallamish meaning flint; hallamish is connected to the Assyrian word elmeshu, referring to a precious stone which was hard, and possibly white, or at least with an insignificant colour, and from which whole rings were sometimes made. A few scholars have suggested that Yahalom may refer to diamonds, owing to their hardness, though the skill of cutting diamonds had not been discovered before the classical era. Although the Septuagint's Onychion is the Greek term for onyx, onyx was not mined prior to the era of classical Greece. "Onyx" is derived from the Greek for fingernail, due to the pink-white veining.{{#tag:ref|The Oxford English Dictionary, Webster's New International Dictionary (Second Edition), and The American Heritage Dictionary of the English Language (College Edition) state that "onyx" derives from the Greek term, "onux", meaning "(finger-)nail", "claw" or onyx-stone. The connection between "nail" or "claw" and the stone is that the onyx stone is usually found with a vein of white on pink background like the lunula of a fingernail. There is no indication in these or other desk dictionaries that the word "onyx" could be derived from a word meaning "ring".|group=Note}} In the Syriac Peshitta of the sixth or seventh century (MS. B.21, Inferiore of the Ambrosian Library in Milan, Italy), the word used to describe this stone is ܢܩܥܬܐ = naq'atha, a word which is sometimes transliterated into Arabic as it is pronounced in Aramaic, mainly by Arabic-speaking Christians. Bar-Ali, a 9th-century Arab author, brings down two opinions about this stone, the naq'atha, saying, by one opinion, that it is "honey-coloured", and by the other opinion that it is "turquoise, a blue-coloured stone". In some versions of the Peshitta, the Aramaic word rendered for the same stone is shabzez, translated as "diamond". This may account for today's understanding of this word, although in ancient times yahalom may have meant something else. Of the well-known honey-coloured gemstones, we find citrine and hessonite garnet (both from Sri Lanka), while in Africa (Tanzania) we find imperial zircon, a honey-coloured stone with extreme brilliance. Spanish Jewish scholar Abraham ibn Ezra says the yahalom was a white stone.

 Third row Lešem (לֶשֶׁם = in the masoretic text) / Ligurios (in the Septuagint) – the names here seem to refer to places: Leshem and Liguria, respectively. Theophrastus mentions the fossilized pine resin, amber, called in Greek liggourrion or lyngurium, as does Dioscorides and Aëtius. In Greek antiquity, this stone was believed to have been the solidified urine of lynxes, and its name a mere corruption of lykos ouron, meaning white urine, presumably in reference to its colour. Pliny (who did not believe the stone existed) described the ligurios as having certain electrical properties, which a number of scholars have taken to imply that it referred to amber. Amber was one of the first items to have been discovered to have electrical properties (see Thales); the English stem electric- derives from the Latin word for amber (elektrum). In the Latin Vulgate the name was given as ligure, a Latinization apparently invented by Flavius Josephus, and equated with lyngurium, but Luther used hyacinth (jacinth), and during the Renaissance belief in lyngurium died away. Modern scholars are inclined to think that the stone must have been similar to the pale colour of natural gold (as opposed to the colour known as gold); The Midrash Rabba (Numbers Rabba 2:7) states that the mineral had a black colour, and is there named כוחלין, meaning the antimony known as stibium. Rabbi Saadia Gaon, and other medieval rabbinical commentators, argued that the gem itself was an onyx (Judeo-Arabic: גזע = جَزَع ), although Abraham ibn Ezra casts doubt on the accuracy of Rabbi Saadia's tradition. Modern English translations use either amber or jacinth.Ševo (שְׁבוֹ = in the masoretic text) / Achates (in the Septuagint) – achates definitely refers to agate, and ševo may be cognate with the Assyrian term subu, meaning agate. Agates were common in Egypt and Assyria, and were regarded as a potent talismans. Isidore of Seville lists agate as being among the black gems. The Midrash Rabba (Numbers 2:7) appears to argue for the jewel in question having been a grey variety. Conversely, in Rabbi Saadia Gaon's (882–942 CE) Judeo-Arabic translation of the Pentateuch, as well as in the medieval Samaritan Arabic translation, the stone is rendered as سبج, meaning obsidian.Aḥlamah (אַחְלָמָה = in the masoretic text) / Amethystos (in the Septuagint) – amethystos refers to amethyst, a purple mineral which was believed to protect against getting drunk from alcohol (amethyst's name refers to this belief, and literally translates as "not intoxicating"), and was commonly used in Egypt. Aḥlamah appears to be derived from a term meaning strong, though it may equally be derived from Ahlamu, a place where amethysts were found; in the Babylonian Targum, aḥlamah is translated into a term meaning strong drinking, which appears to reference beliefs about amethyst, but in the Jerusalem Targum, it is translated into a term meaning calf's eye. The Midrash Rabba (Numbers Rabba 2:7), while describing the stone's colour, says: "[It is] similar to clear wine whose redness is not too strong."

 Fourth row Taršīš (תַּרְשִׁישִׁ = in the masoretic text) / Chrysolithos (in the Septuagint) – in some other places the Septuagint instead has anthrax (meaning coal) where the masoretic reads tarshish. taršīš is thought by scholars to refer to tarshish, in reference to the main source of the mineral being tarshish. Chrysolithos does not refer specifically to chrysolite, which was named much later, but is an adjective which translates as "gold-stone", meaning either that it was golden, as in the Libyan desert glass, or that it contained flecks of gold. With golden flecks it could refer to lapis lazuli, which would fit the Targums' description of the gem being "the colour of the sea". As a golden material if translucent, it could refer to topaz or to amber, and since chrysolithos came to mean topaz in particular by the classical era, some scholars favour this as being the most likely use, though it would be jarring for there to be two different translucent yellow gemstones so close to one another on the breastplate. If an opaque golden material, it could refer to a yellow form of jasper or of serpentine, which were commonly used in Egypt and Babylon. The 2nd century Jewish translator, Symmachus, renders the word as yakinthos, meaning "jacinth", or "hyacinth". There is little certainty among scholars in regard to which of these is the most likely to be the jewel in question.Šoham (שֹׁהַם = in the masoretic text) / Beryllios (in the Septuagint) – in some other places the Septuagint instead has onychion, or smaragdos, or the phrase leek-green stone, where the masoretic reads šoham; beryllios refers to beryl but earlier to the blue-green colour of the sea, onychion refers to onyx, and smaragdos literally means green stone and refers to a bright columnar crystal (either beryl or rock crystal). Onyx is an opaque and banded stone, while smaragdos is translucent, and beryl is cloudy, and all these come in several colours. Šoham could be derived from the Assyrian word samtu, meaning dark or cloudy; it could be derived from the Arabic word meaning pale, in which case it fits more with onyx and certain forms of beryl, excluding the emerald, with Heliodor being the form of beryl fitting the leek green description; it could be derived from the Arabic word musahham, meaning striped garment, and therefore very definitely describing something like onyx; or it could be a place name, for example there is a place in Yemen named Soheim. Jewish tradition generally favours leek-green beryl (heliodor) as the likely meaning of šoham, though scholars think it is more likely to be malachite, which can be green enough to be compared to smaragdos and the blue-green colour of the sea (the original meaning of beryllios), is cloudy enough to be compared to a cloudy form of beryl, and is striped and opaque enough to be confused with a form of onyx. According to Epiphanius’ Treatise on the Twelve Stones (Epiphanius de Gemmis), the beryl was "white like a cloud". Scholars point out that the Syriac form of the word is berūlā and/or belūra, the latter evidently going back to a Pahlevi form (the old Persian tongue), and all in turn to the Sanskrit वैडूर्य = vaiḍūrya (Pali: veḷuriyaṁ), the gemstone which is called in English, "cat's eye, beryl", a variety of chalcedonic quartz that has a chatoyant lustre resembling the eye of a cat when cut.Yāšǝfêh (יָשְׁפֵה = in the masoretic text) / Iaspis (in the Septuagint and Josephus). Although yāšǝfêh and iaspis are cognate to jasper, they do not quite have the same meaning; while jasper is usually red, the mineral which the Greeks called iaspis was generally a richly green one (the most prized form of jasper), and scholars think this is most likely to be the colour referred to by yāšǝfêh; the ambiguity of the term is present in the Targums, where the jewel is variously identified as a ruby (which is red), as a hyacinth (which is yellow), or as an emerald (which is green). In the Babylonian Talmud, one opinion states that the gemstone was the same as kadkhod, a stone described by Bar-Ali as being al-karkahan = الكركھن (the Baghdadi onyx), "a kind of gemstone from which they cut [smaller] stones for setting in ouches". Rabbi Saadia Gaon, however, in his Judeo-Arabic translation of Isaiah, translates kadkhod as karkand, a red variety of precious stone. Josephus, quoting from one version of the Septuagint, says that it was a beryl. Numbers Rabba 2:7 says that the stone was varicolored, meaning, all of the colors combined were to be found in the yāšǝfêh.

 12 jewels in the New Testament 
In the New Testament Book of Revelation is the description of a city wall, with each layer of stones in the wall being from a different material; in the original Koine Greek, the layers are given as iaspis, sapphiros, chalcedon, smaragdos, sardonyx, sardion, chrysolithos, beryllos, topazion, chrysoprason, yacinthos, amethystos. This list appears to be based on the Septuagint's version of the list of jewels in the Breastplate – if the top half of the breastplate was rotated by 180 degrees, and the bottom half turned upside down, with Onchion additionally swapping places with Topazion, the lists become extremely similar; there are only four differences:
 Onchion (literally onyx) has become sardonyx (red onyx)
 Anthrax has become chalcedon (literally meaning chalcedony, of which the red variety is the most common). Anthrax literally means coal, presumably meaning the red colour of burning coal.
 Ligurios has become chrysoprason. Scholars suspect that ligurios was a pale yellowish mineral, and although chrysoprase now refers to a specific gemstone which is generally apple-green in colour, in earlier times it referred to gems of a yellowish leek-green, such as peridot; chrysoprase literally means golden leek.
 Achates (agate) has been replaced by yacinthos (jacinth). According to classical rabbinical literature, the specific agate was of a sky-blue colour, and though jacinth now refers to a red-tinted clear gem, this was not the case at the time the Book of Revelation was written, and at that time jacinth appears to have referred to a bluish gem; Pliny describes jacinth as a dull and blueish amethyst, while Solinus describes it as a clear blue tinted gem – the modern sapphire.

Pattern
Whether there is any pattern to the choice of gemstones depends on their identity. Taking the majority view of scholars in regard to the identity of the gems, and including the implication from the Book of Revelation that the onyx at the end of the fourth row was a sardonyx'', there are four colours – red, green, yellow, and blue – each represented by a clear gem (red – carbuncle, green – heliodor, yellow – chrysolite, blue – amethyst), an opaque gem (red – carnelian/red jasper, green – green jasper, yellow – yellow jasper/yellow serpentine, blue – lapis lazuli), and a striped gem (red – sardonyx, green – malachite, yellow – pale golden agate, blue – sky-blue agate). The four colours of red, green, yellow, and blue, are the first four colours (apart from black and white) distinguished by languages, and are distinguished in all cultures with at least six colour distinctions (the other two being black and white). These colours roughly correspond to the sensitivities of the retinal ganglion cells. (The retinal ganglia process colour by positioning it within a blue to yellow range, and separately positioning it within a red to green range.)

See also 
Ephod
Priestly golden head plate
Priestly robe (Judaism)
Priestly sash
Priestly tunic
Priestly turban
Priestly undergarments

Other
Birthstone – a concept that originated from the interpretation of the stones in the plates
List of inscriptions in biblical archaeology
Twelve Stones – rocks symbolizing the Twelve Tribes of Israel

Notes

References

Bibliography

External links

Book of Exodus
Jewish religious clothing
Hardstone carving
Gemstones in religion
Breastplate